The abbreviation MTLD may stand for
Movement for the Triumph of Democratic Liberties
mTLD, a top-level domain registry, see .mobi
measure of textual lexical diversity